Ovaltine (also known by its original name Ovomaltine) is a brand of milk flavoring product made with malt extract (except in the blue packaging in the United States), sugar (except in Switzerland), and whey. Some flavors also have cocoa.  Ovaltine, a registered trademark of Associated British Foods, is made by Wander AG, a subsidiary of Twinings, which acquired the brand from Novartis in 2002, except in the United States, where Nestlé acquired the rights separately from Novartis in the late 2000s.

History

Ovaltine was developed in 1904 by chemist  (1867–1950), in Bern, Switzerland, where it is known by its original name, Ovomaltine (from ovum, Latin for "egg", and malt, which were originally its key ingredients). In 1927, the factory moved out to the village of Neuenegg, a short distance west of Bern, where it is still produced.

Ovomaltine was exported to Britain as Ovaltine in 1909. A factory was built in Kings Langley, which took it to the United States as well. By 1915, Ovaltine was being manufactured in Villa Park, Illinois, for the U.S. market. Ovaltine was later manufactured in Peterborough, Ontario, for distribution in Canada. Gerald Ethelbert Goldsmith was the president of the Ovaltine Foods at this time.

Originally advertised as consisting solely of "malt, milk, eggs, flavoured with cocoa", the formulation has changed over the decades, and today several formulations are sold in different parts of the world. In India and the UK, it no longer contains eggs.

A chocolate malt version is sold as a powder which is mixed with hot or cold milk as a beverage. Malt Ovaltine (a version without cocoa) and Rich Chocolate Ovaltine (a version without malt) are also available in some markets. Ovaltine has also been available in the form of chocolate bars, chocolate Easter eggs, parfait, cookies, and breakfast cereals.

Ovaltine also manufactured PDQ Chocolate Flavor Beads, PDQ Choco Chips, and Eggnog Flavored PDQ, which are no longer available. These drink mixes were very popular from the 1960s to the 1980s.

Villa Park, Illinois, was home to the Ovaltine factory in the United States from 1917 until the company's purchase and withdrawal in 1988. The Villa Park Historical Society maintains a permanent exhibit of Ovaltine advertising and memorabilia. The old factory was converted to loft apartments keeping the original floors and wall exposed, and is known today as Ovaltine Court.

Acquisitions
In 1992, Himmel Group obtained the right to make and sell Ovaltine in the U.S. from Sandoz Nutrition Corporation.  In 2002, Himmel sold their rights to Novartis.  As of 2007, Nestlé had acquired Novartis' medical nutrition division and has the rights to Ovaltine.

International appeal

Ovaltine was very popular in Britain, and was manufactured at Kings Langley in Hertfordshire using a process that included GEA Wiegand falling film evaporators to concentrate liquid malt extract which was then dried under vacuum in steam heated band dryers. The art deco style Ovaltine factory in Kings Langley is a well-known local landmark. Production ceased in 2002 and the factory has now been redeveloped as luxury flats. Near the factory was a health farm run by the Ovaltine works which was set up as a model farm and a health resort for disadvantaged children, which operated until the 1960s. Later, the farm land was sold and is now largely occupied by the M25 motorway. The Ovaltine Egg Farm is now the site of Renewable Energy Systems Ltd.

In October 2002, the food and drinks division of Novartis, the maker of Ovaltine, was bought by Associated British Foods. ABF currently produces Ovaltine in Switzerland, China, Thailand and Australia. In Canada, Ovaltine is produced by Grace Foods in biscuit and powdered drink forms. In the United States Nestlé manufactures Ovaltine.

In Hong Kong, Ovaltine, like Horlicks, is known as a café drink. It is served at cha chaan tengs as well as fast-food shops such as Café de Coral and Maxim's Express. It is served hot, or on ice as a cold drink. In Brazil, it is commonly mixed with vanilla ice cream. In the Asian market, it is a chocolate ice cream flavoured with Ovaltine powder. The Ovomaltine brand is highly recognizable in Switzerland, and the brand is associated with skiing and snowboarding. The McCafé in Hong Kong provides "Ovaltine Crunchy Latte" and other drinks and desserts.

In Malaysia, Ovaltine has lost its popularity to Milo.  Ovaltine is sold in Tetra Pak cartons for cold serving and widely available in shops and supermarkets, yet it has a low profile compared to similar beverages in the market. In Japan, Ovaltine was sold for a short period in the late 1970s by Calpis Industries (presently Calpis Co., Ltd.), but it was not a commercial success. In Australia, Ovalteenies are sold as round tablets of compressed Ovaltine, eaten as candy.

Brazilian fast-food chain Bob's, the largest competitor to McDonald's in that country, offered, since 1959, milkshakes and sundaes made with Ovaltine, where it goes by the name of "Ovomaltine", which became a flagship product of the fast-food chain in Brazil. In 2016, McDonald's acquired exclusive rights to sell "Ovomaltine"-branded milkshakes. Brazil has the second largest Ovaltine factory, in São Paulo, and is the second largest consumer market for the product, after Thailand. The Brazilian Ovaltine differs from other varieties, originating from an assembly line malfunction that made the powder crispier that is still maintained today.

In 2011, Ovaltine was banned in Denmark under legislation forbidding the sale of food products with added vitamins unless claims about their effectiveness are proven.

In popular culture
The U.S. children's radio series Little Orphan Annie (1931–1940) and Captain Midnight (1938–1949), and the subsequent Captain Midnight TV series (1954–1956), were sponsored by Ovaltine. They had promotions in which listeners could save proofs-of-purchase from Ovaltine jars to obtain radio premiums, such as "secret decoder ring" badges, or pins that could be used to decode messages in the program.

In the movie A Christmas Story, Ovaltine is mentioned when Ralphie, played by actor Peter Billingsley, solves a cryptogram puzzle from a secret message by the popular radio show Little Orphan Annie.

Another radio program aimed at five- to fourteen-year-olds, The League of Ovaltineys, was broadcast to Great Britain by Radio Luxembourg on Sunday evenings at 5:30 PM. Beginning in February 1935, it was broadcast until September 1939, when the outbreak of World War II forced closure of the station, and again after the war from 1952. As with the U.S. program, listeners could obtain badges, pins, and secret codes. The Ovaltineys' advertising jingle, which featured the popular English singing trio The Beverley Sisters, was regarded as one of the most successful jingles of the era.

See also

 Akta-Vite
 Carnation (brand)
 Malted milk
 Horlicks
 List of chocolate beverages
 List of hot beverages
 Nesquik, another drink mix produced by Nestlé
 Nestlé Milo
 Ovaltineys
 Ovalteenies
 Postum
 Culinary Heritage of Switzerland

References

External links

Official site 
UK Ovaltine site
USA Ovaltine site
Villa Park Historical Society's Ovaltine Exhibit
What Is Ovaltine, Please? by Brendan I. Koerner

Swiss cuisine
Chocolate drinks
Drink brands
Culinary Heritage of Switzerland
Villa Park, Illinois
Nestlé brands
Associated British Foods brands
Products introduced in 1904
Hot drinks
Swiss chocolate
Malt-based drinks
Milk-based drinks
Instant foods and drinks
Powdered drink mixes
Swiss chocolate companies